Lucas Manuel Zelarayán (born 20 June 1992) is a professional footballer who plays as an attacking midfielder for Major League Soccer club Columbus Crew. Born in Argentina, he represents the Armenia national team.

Club career

Belgrano
Born in Córdoba, Argentina, Zelarayán was a Belgrano youth graduate. He made his senior debut on 25 April 2012, coming on as a second-half substitute for Lucas Parodi in a 2–1 away loss against Rosario Central, for the season's Copa Argentina.

Zelarayán made his Primera División debut on 1 March 2013, replacing Jorge Velázquez in a 2–0 away loss against Newell's Old Boys. His first professional goal came on 7 April of the following year, as he scored the winner in a 2–1 home defeat of River Plate.

On 5 December 2014, after becoming a regular starter, Zelarayán extended his contract until 2018.

Tigres UANL
On 21 December 2015, Zelarayán agreed to a contract with Liga MX side Tigres UANL. He debuted for the club the following 10 January, replacing Rafael Sóbis in a 1–0 loss at Toluca.
Zelarayán scored his first goal abroad on 6 February 2016, netting the last in a 3–1 win at Chiapas. On 22 January 2017, he scored a brace in a 4–2 home win against América.

Columbus Crew
On 20 December 2019, Zelarayán moved to Major League Soccer side Columbus Crew for $8 million. Zelarayán made his debut against New York City FC, scoring the match-winning goal in the 56th minute. He was named the league's Newcomer of the Year at the end of the 2020 regular season. In the 2020 MLS Cup final, Zelarayán scored two goals and assisted on another in Columbus' 3–0 win over Seattle Sounders FC to help them win their second ever MLS Cup title. Zelarayán was named the MLS Cup Most Valuable Player after his performance.

During the 2021 MLS season, Zelarayán scored a total of five free kick goals, with two of them coming in one game vs New York City FC. Both free kick goals turned out to be crucial for the Crew, as they ended up winning 2–1, with the game winning free kick coming in the 5th minute of second half stoppage time, which earned Zelarayán recognition as MLS Player of the Week. Zelarayán was named MLS Player of the Week a second time in the 2021 season after scoring 2 goals in a 3–1 victory against DC United. Zelarayán finished the year leading the club in both goals and assists with twelve and seven respectively.

On 2 December 2021, it was announced that Zelarayán had signed a contract extension with the Crew, keeping him with Columbus through the 2024 Major League Soccer season with an option for 2025.

On 30 March 2022, Zelarayán was voted MLS Player of the Month. On 5 October, Zelarayán scored the longest free kick goal in MLS history since the statistic has been tracked; a 56 yard attempt during a match against Charlotte FC. That goal marked his 17th goal from outside of the penalty area since joining the league in 2020, more than double of any other player in the league.

During week two of the 2023 season, Zelarayán scored both of Columbus' goals in a 2–0 victory over D.C. United, earning the league's Player of the Week award in the process.

International career
Born in Argentina, Zelarayán is of Armenian descent through his father. He received an invitation to represent the Armenia national team in June 2018. He accepted the invitation to play for Armenia national team in October 2021. He debuted with Armenia in a 1–1 2022 FIFA World Cup qualification tie with Iceland on 8 October 2021.

Career statistics

Club

International

Honours
UANL
Liga MX: Apertura 2016, Apertura 2017, Clausura 2019
Campeón de Campeones: 2016, 2017, 2018
Campeones Cup: 2018

Columbus Crew
MLS Cup: 2020
Campeones Cup: 2021

Individual
MLS Newcomer of the Year: 2020
MLS Cup MVP: 2020
MLS All-Star: 2021
MLS Player of the Month: February/March 2022

References

External links

1992 births
Living people
Footballers from Córdoba, Argentina
Armenian footballers
Armenia international footballers
Argentine footballers
Armenian people of Argentine descent
Sportspeople of Argentine descent
Argentine people of Armenian descent
Citizens of Armenia through descent
Association football midfielders
Argentine Primera División players
Club Atlético Belgrano footballers
Liga MX players
Major League Soccer players
Tigres UANL footballers
Columbus Crew players
Designated Players (MLS)
Armenian expatriate footballers
Argentine expatriate footballers
Argentine expatriate sportspeople in Mexico
Expatriate footballers in Mexico
Armenian expatriate sportspeople in the United States
Argentine expatriate sportspeople in the United States
Expatriate soccer players in the United States